Suderburg is a municipality in the district of Uelzen, in Lower Saxony, Germany. It is situated approximately 11 km southwest of Uelzen.

Suderburg is also the seat of the Samtgemeinde ("collective municipality") Suderburg.

Municipal divisions 
The parish of Suderburg consists of Suderburg itself and the following villages that had been independent until the municipal reform in 1972: Bahnsen, Böddenstedt, Hamerstorf, Hösseringen, Holxen and Räber.

History
The first known written instance of the name was as Sutherburg in 1004.

In 1847, the railway line Celle–Uelzen–Lüneburg–Harburg–Wilhelmsburg was opened, and Suderburg railway station was opened in 1850 and extended in 1859.

In 1957, the villages Graulingen, Oldendorf I and Suderburg were merged into Suderburg.

Notable people
 Sophus Schmidt (1792–1841), Hanoveran liberation fighter, bailiff in Bleckede and landowner in Suderburg
 Heinrich Christoph Wilhelm Hillmer (1831–1916), building master
 Karl Hillmer (1869–1944), director of the Wiesenbauschule
 Carsten Kadach (born 1964), former FIFA assistant

Sources
The text includes a translation of part of the German Wikipedia article.

References

Uelzen (district)